Sonceria "Ann" Bishop Berry (born July 24, 1955) is an American political aide serving as the 34th Secretary of the United States Senate. She assumed office on March 1, 2021.

Early life and education 
Berry is a native of Birmingham, Alabama and graduated from J. H. Phillips High School. She earned a Bachelor of Arts degree in education from the University of North Alabama.

Career 
Berry has worked as a staffer in the United States Senate for four decades, including in the offices of Tom Carper, John Edwards, Daniel Patrick Moynihan, Howell Heflin, and Doug Jones. Most recently, she was deputy chief of staff for Patrick Leahy. She is the first African-American to hold the position of Secretary of the United States Senate.

Personal life 
Berry and her husband, Reginald A. Berry, have one daughter, Elizabeth Berry.

References 

Living people
People from Birmingham, Alabama
Secretaries of the United States Senate
University of North Alabama alumni
1955 births